Agnin is a commune in the Isère department in the Auvergne-Rhône-Alpes region of south-eastern France.

The inhabitants of the commune are known as Agnitaires 

The commune has been awarded one flower by the National Council of Towns and Villages in Bloom in the Competition of cities and villages in Bloom.

Geography

Agnin is located some 25 km south of Vienne and 5 km north-east of Saint-Rambert-d'Albon. It can be accessed by the road D519 from near Chanas in the west passing through the southern part of the commune and continuing to Bouge-Chambalud. Parallel to this road in the north of the commune is the D51 road from Salaise-sur-Sanne in the west passing through the commune and the village and continuing to Anjou in the east. The D131 also comes from the Ville-sous-Anjou in the north joining the D51 west of the village. The Route de Bouge connects the village to the D519 in the south of the commune. The commune is mostly farmland with significant areas of housing in the north and some small areas of forest in the south.

An unnamed stream flows south forming the western border of the commune and another unnamed stream flows through the commune then forms the south-western border. They both join in the south-west and continue flowing west. The Dolon stream forms the southern border of the commune

Neighbouring communes and villages

Toponymy
Like the nearby town of Anjou the origin of the name Agnin comes from the name of a Roman noble Anianus who owned vast territory in that era.  The name of the town changed a few centuries later to Agnino which was the name used in the 11th century to describe this commune. Then over the following centuries Agnino became the Agnin known today.

Heraldry

Administration

List of Successive Mayors of Agnin

Population

Sites and Monuments

The portal and tower of Bâtie Manor are registered as historical monuments.
Gaulas Castle
A Church from the 12th century
Typical houses
Gallo-Roman remains at Golat

See also
Communes of the Isère department

References

External links

Agnin Official website 
Agnin on the old IGN website 
Agnin on the 1750 Cassini Map

Communes of Isère
Dauphiné